is a 2017 Japanese romance drama film starring Minami Hamabe, Takumi Kitamura, Keiko Kitagawa and Shun Oguri. Directed by Shō Tsukikawa, it is based on the 2015 novel I Want to Eat Your Pancreas by Yoru Sumino.

Plot

An introvert boy, Haruki Shiga (Takumi Kitamura) comes across a book in a hospital waiting room. Looking through the book, he discovers that it is a diary kept by his very popular classmate, a girl (Minami Hamabe). The girl, Yamauchi Sakura who happens to see him holding on to her diary then reveals to him that she is secretly suffering from a fatal pancreatic illness.

Sakura then playfully forces Haruki to attend to all her whims and fancies. Initially, Haruki begrudgingly accedes to her requests, citing the excuse that he is merely putting up with a sick classmate. However, as time passes, he finds himself being drawn to her and he begins to enjoy the time he spent with her.

Cast
 Minami Hamabe as Sakura Yamauchi
 Takumi Kitamura as Haruki Shiga
 Shun Oguri as Haruki Shiga (12 years later)
 Keiko Kitagawa as Kyōko (12 years later)
 Karen Ōtomo as Kyōko
 Yūma Yamoto as Gamu-kun
 Yusuke Kamiji as Gamu-kun (12 years later)
 Dori Sakurada as Takahiro
 Daichi Morishita as Kuriyama
 Satomi Nagano as Sakura's mother

Box office
In Japan, the film grossed  ($ million), becoming the fifth highest-grossing domestic film of 2017. Overseas, the film grossed  in China, $3,457,444 in South Korea, $277,019 in the United States and Canada, and $115,494 in Spain, Thailand and Australia.

Awards

References

External links 
  
 

2017 films
2010s Japanese-language films
Japanese romantic drama films
Films based on Japanese novels
Films directed by Shō Tsukikawa
Toho films
2010s Japanese films